Yeongyang County (Yeongyang-gun) is an inland county in the north-eastern area of North Gyeongsang Province, South Korea.

Geography
An isolated area difficult to access, Yeongyang is sometimes called an "inland island". The county has the lowest population of all counties in North Gyeongsang Province (without Ulleung County), being mountainous with deep ravines, and only 10 percent of land is cultivable.

Climate
Yeongyang has a humid continental climate (Köppen: Dwa), but can be considered a borderline humid subtropical climate (Köppen: Cwa) using the  isotherm.

Local specialties
The county is famous for its apples and chili peppers, and is home to the Yeongyang Chili Pepper Experimental Station. From 1984, the county has elected a "Miss Chili Pepper" to represent Yeongyang chili peppers.

Culture
The area is  known as a centre of literature, with the tradition of scholars reading and reciting poetry deep in the mountains, from which have emerged Oh Il-do, Cho Chi-hun and Yi Munyol. Within the county, the Yeondaeam historic temple is located in the village of Samji-Ri.

Administrative divisions 

Yeongyang County is divided into 1 eup and 5 myeon.

Twin towns – sister cities
Yeongyang is twinned with:

  Gangdong-gu, South Korea 
  Eunpyeong-gu, South Korea

References

External links
County government website

 
Counties of North Gyeongsang Province